Deerhorn Mountain is a  peak in the Sierra Nevada in Tulare County, California. It is located along the Kings-Kern Divide in the southern part of Kings Canyon National Park.

According to Place Names of the Sierra Nevada (Peter Browning), it was "named in 1895 by J. N. LeConte because of the resemblance of its double summit to two horns."

See also
List of mountain peaks of California

References

Mountains of Tulare County, California
Mountains of Kings Canyon National Park
North American 4000 m summits